The Rossi Model 972 is a stainless-steel, 6-shot, double-action revolver, chambered in .357 Magnum. It was manufactured by Rossi Firearms of Brazil.

References

External links
 Listing on Rossi site 
 Owner's Manual 

Rossi Firearms
Revolvers of Brazil